Zhengning County is a county in the east of Gansu province, China, bordering Shaanxi province to the east and south. It is under the administration of the prefecture-level city of Qingyang. Its postal code is 745300, and its population in 1999 was  people.

It was established in 420 AD during the Northern Wei dynasty as Yongzhou County. In 598 during the Sui dynasty it became Luochuan County, named after the county seat Luochuan. By the Tang dynasty it was named Zhenning County, and received the current name Zhengning during the Qing dynasty.

In 1635, rebel leader Li Zicheng fought a battle against Ming dynasty general Cao Wenzhao (:zh:曹文诏) in Zhengning.

Economy 
Zhengning County's important agriculture products are tobacco, green onion and apples. It also has several coal mines.

Administrative divisions
Zhengning County is divided to 8 towns and 2 townships. The county government is located in Shanhe town. Until 1930, it was governed from Luochuan. In 2005 Luochuan was abolished as a township and placed under Yonghe town.
Towns

Townships
 Wuqingyuan Township()
 Sanjia Township()

Climate

See also
 List of administrative divisions of Gansu

References

External links
  Official website (Chinese)

 
Zhengning County
Qingyang